The 1924 Liège–Bastogne–Liège was the 14th edition of the Liège–Bastogne–Liège cycle race and was held on 10 August 1924. The race started and finished in Liège. The race was won by René Vermandel.

General classification

References

1924
1924 in Belgian sport